Carlos Arturo Izquierdo Mendez (born October 2, 1997 in Buga, Valle del Cauca) is a Colombian freestyle wrestler. He competed in the men's freestyle 74 kg event at the 2016 Summer Olympics, in which he was eliminated in the round of 16 by Jabrayil Hasanov.

He represented Colombia at the 2020 Summer Olympics in the men's freestyle 86 kg event.

References

External links
 

1997 births
Living people
Colombian male sport wrestlers
Olympic wrestlers of Colombia
Wrestlers at the 2016 Summer Olympics
Wrestlers at the 2019 Pan American Games
Pan American Games medalists in wrestling
Pan American Games bronze medalists for Colombia
Medalists at the 2019 Pan American Games
Wrestlers at the 2020 Summer Olympics
Sportspeople from Valle del Cauca Department
21st-century Colombian people